The Lombi or Rombi language may be:
Rombi language, a Bantu language of Cameroon
Lombi language (DRC), a Sudanic language of Congo